Ron Schmeits is an American conservative activist, and gun rights lobbyist. Schmeits was president of the National Rifle Association from May 2009 to May 2011. He succeeded John C. Sigler and was succeeded by David Keene. Schmeits was the NRA's 60th president since its founding in 1871. As is NRA tradition, Schmeits served as first vice president prior to being elected president.

Schmeits has been an NRA life member for 20 years. He became a benefactor member in 2005. In 2000, he was elected to the board of directors.

Early years 
Being born and raised on a ranch in Nebraska, Ron Schmeits was brought up around firearms and the sport of hunting. Schmeits’ alma mater was University of Nebraska. He later attended Rutgers University where he obtained his MBA in Bank Management. Upon graduation, Schmeits went to work in Minnesota in the banking industry.

Career 
In the late 1970s, he was elected mayor of Jordan, Minnesota. After his term of mayor ended, Schmeits stayed active in the political system. In 2003, he along with New Mexico’s governor and legislation passed the Concealed Handgun Carry Act. He also served on the Governor’s Business Advisory Committee dealing with concerns over Second Amendment rights, water distribution, investments, and business. Schmeits, in addition, served as an executive authority of the U.S.-Canadian River Compact Commission.

Personal life 
Schmeits is an avid lifelong hunter, beginning at a young age with the typical weapon of choice, a BB gun. He has harvested several types of game from the small rodents, rabbits and squirrels, to the big game trophies, bears and mountain lions. Presently living in New Mexico, Schmeits gets many opportunities to add new game to his collection.

Board of directors experience 
Ron Schmeits was elected to the board of directors in 2000. While on the board, Schmeits served as chairman of the Membership and Investment Oversight Committees; vice-chairman of Finance and Publications Policies Committees; and a member of the Audit and Meeting Site Selections Committees. He also served as a chairman on the board of trustees for the NRA Whittington Center.

Affiliations 
Ronald Schmeits is an active member in several different affiliations. He is a member of the NRA Heritage Society and a range of organizations and groups both dealing in civil and community service. Such organizations include the Elks and Rotary. In addition to his vast list of organizations and affiliations, he is a member of the New Mexico Bankers Association. Schmeits is also in a variety of organizations that are hunting/firearm based such as, the New Mexico Wildlife Foundation, Single Action Shooting Society, the Amateur Trapshooting Association, Ducks Unlimited, the Rocky Mountain Elk Foundation, Missouri Valley Arms Collectors Association (MVACA), and the Boy Scouts of America’s Philmont Inspection Team.

Corporate affiliations 
Along with being in the presidential office of the NRA, Ronald Schmeits is an active affiliate in several corporate businesses. He holds the office of president, CEO, and director for the International Bank in Raton, New Mexico. Some other offices Schmeits are appointed to are: CEO and chairman of the board of International Bank in Trinidad, Colorado; chairman of the board and director of the Farmers and Stockmens Bank in Clayton, New Mexico; and vice president and director of Raton Capital Corporation in Raton, New Mexico. Some former offices he has been active in are president of the New Mexico Bankers Association and Raton Chamber of Commerce and director of the University of New Mexico Foundation Finance Committee.

References 

American bankers
Mayors of places in Minnesota
People from Nebraska
Presidents of the National Rifle Association
Rutgers University alumni
University of Nebraska alumni
Living people
American gun rights activists
People from Jordan, Minnesota
Year of birth missing (living people)